Adolf Julius Zinkl (10 June 1871 – 3 June 1944) was  an Austrian chess master.

Tournament results
Born in Bohemia, he settled in Vienna, where he played in many tournaments in the 1890s. He took 4th in 1892/93, shared 2nd (Quadrangular) in 1893, took 5th in 1893/94 (Jacques Schwarz won), drew a match with Carl Schlechter (5½ : 5½) and lost to Georg Marco (2½ : 5½), both in 1894, took 5th in 1895 (Marco won), took 8th in 1895/96 (Schlechter and Max Weiss won), tied for 4–5th in 1896 and took 6th in 1897/98, both won by Marco. He won in 1899, and tied for 5–7th in 1899/1900 (Kolisch memorial, Géza Maróczy won).

Zinkl also took 14th at Leipzig 1894 (the 9th DSB Congress, Siegbert Tarrasch won), and tied for 17–18th at Berlin 1897 (Rudolf Charousek won).

References

External links

1871 births
1944 deaths
Czech chess players
Austrian chess players